Pablo Martín Benavides (born 20 April 1986) is a Spanish professional golfer.

Martín was born in Málaga, and attended Oklahoma State University in the United States. He was named the Jack Nicklaus Award winner, the Haskins Award winner in 2006 as the best collegiate golfer in the world.  He won the 2005 Porter Cup.

In April 2007, Martín became the first amateur ever to win a European Tour event when he captured the Estoril Open de Portugal title. As an amateur, he had to forfeit the winner's prize money of €208,330, but the win still granted him exemption on the European Tour until the end of 2009. He turned professional in June 2007, and completed the season playing on both the European Tour and the PGA Tour, relying on sponsors' invitations for PGA Tour events.

Martín did not enjoy immediate success on the European Tour after he turned professional, with only a single top ten finish in the 2008 and 2009 seasons but managed to retain his card for the 2010 season by finishing 118th on the 2009 Race to Dubai. However in the first event of the 2010 season, the Alfred Dunhill Championship, he won again to become the first player to win on the European Tour as both an amateur and as a professional. In December 2010, he defended this title winning the 2011 Alfred Dunhill Championship.

After a poor 2012 season, Martín lost full playing rights on the European Tour and did not complete the Qualifying School.

Amateur wins
2001 Boys Amateur Championship
2004 Carris Trophy
2005 Porter Cup

Professional wins (3)

European Tour wins (3)

1Co-sanctioned by the Sunshine Tour

Results in major championships

"T" = tied

Results in World Golf Championships

QF, R16, R32, R64 = Round in which player lost in match play
"T" = tied

Team appearances
Amateur
European Boys' Team Championship (representing Spain): 2002 (winners), 2003
Jacques Léglise Trophy (representing Continental Europe): 2002, 2003
Eisenhower Trophy (representing Spain): 2002, 2006
European Amateur Team Championship (representing Spain): 2003 (winners), 2005
 European Youths' Team Championship (representing Spain): 2004
Bonallack Trophy (representing Europe): 2004
Palmer Cup (representing Europe): 2005, 2006 (winners)

Professional
Royal Trophy (representing Europe): 2010 (winners), 2011 (winners)

References

External links

Spanish male golfers
Oklahoma State Cowboys golfers
European Tour golfers
Sunshine Tour golfers
Sportspeople from Málaga
1986 births
Living people